Swedish death metal is a death metal music scene developed in Sweden. Many Swedish death metal bands are associated with the melodic death metal movement, thus giving Swedish death metal a different sound from other variations of death metal. Unlike American death metal groups, the first Swedish bands were rooted in hardcore punk. Gothenburg has a large melodic death metal scene while Stockholm is known for its more raw death metal scene.

History

Precursors
Unlike American groups, the Swedish death metal scene's earliest originators were influenced by punk rock, especially the D-beat and hardcore punk scene. Bathory, who would subsequently become a primary influence for the black metal scene, were a pivotal group in Swedish extreme metal.
In the early 1990s, two death metal scenes emerged in Gothenburg and Stockholm. The first wave of "Swedish death metal" consisted of the bands Carnage, Morbid and Nihilist, who fragmented later into Entombed, Dismember and Unleashed. Many of these bands used the trademark Tomas Skogsberg/Sunlight Studios "buzzsaw" guitar tone. It was created by using detuned electric guitars (usually C# standard or lower), a maxed out Boss HM-2 Heavy Metal pedal, sometimes in combination with a single guitar through a Boss DS-1 Distortion pedal. The originator of this guitar sound was Nihilist guitarist Leffe Cuzner, though it was evolved and altered over the years. Newer bands playing in the "old school" Swedish style include Bloodbath and Repugnant. According to Stewart Mason of AllMusic, the "increasingly melodic" style of Swedish death metal combines the post-hardcore aggression and guttural vocals of black metal with melodic and technically proficient guitar lines.

Gothenburg scene
Later, Swedish and Finnish bands used grindcore-based riffs and began adding progressive rock influences and the scene moved from Stockholm to Gothenburg. The Gothenburg sound, (also known as "melodic death metal", "Gothenburg melodic death metal" and "melodeath"), propelled by both the Boss HM-2 Heavy Metal distortion effect pedal with cleaner recordings and melded with new wave of British heavy metal guitar lines, was pioneered by bands such as At the Gates, Dark Tranquillity and In Flames for their respective albums: Slaughter of the Soul, The Gallery and The Jester Race. Other groups to have emerged from the Swedish death metal scene include Scar Symmetry, Hypocrisy, Tiamat, Arch Enemy, Soilwork, Meshuggah, Amon Amarth, Edge of Sanity, Opeth, Desultory, Cemetary, Avatar and The Haunted.

Influence
The death metal scene in Sweden has influenced many bands and genres outside Sweden. 
Stewart Mason has noted this popularity in the United States, using the term "Swedecore" to describe Scandinavian-style metal as played by non-Nordic bands. The Stockholm sound has been known to be very influenced by the first Entombed album and bands such as Autopsy, Death and Repulsion. The Stockholm sound has less reception but is strictly followed by bands like Trap Them and Rotten Sound. Melodic death metal, on the other hand, has had a notable influence on the melodic metalcore sound of the 2000s.

See also

List of Swedish death metal bands
Early Norwegian black metal scene

References

Footnotes

Works cited

Olivier "Zoltar" Badin, "In the Embrace of Evil: Swedish Death Metal New Blood", Terrorizer #182, April 2009, pp. 32–34.
James Hoare, "Left Hand Pathfinders", Terrorizer #182, April 2009, pp. 28–29.
Perlah, Jeff. "Justin Foley of Killswitch Engage: Playing Heavy, having Fun". Modern Drummer 10 2004: 96,100, 102, 104, 106.
Freeborn, Robert. "A Selective Discography of Scandinavian Heavy Metal Music". Notes - Quarterly Journal of the Music Library Association 66.4 (2010): 840-50. 

Death metal
Music scenes
Swedish styles of music
Extreme metal
Heavy metal by location